Mirela Dulgheru–Renda, aka Mirela Renda, (born Mirela Dulgheru October 5, 1966) is a Romanian-born Turkish female long jumper. She became a naturalised Turkish citizen by marriage in 1999, and adopted the surname Renda.

She is the holder of third national performance outdoor long jump (7.14 m), a Romanian national record in long jump indoor (6.99 m) and a national record at sprint distances sample 50 m, 60 m and 80 m. She won twelve titles at Balkan Championships, and was over hundred times winner at national level in Romania.

Mirela Dulgheru competed for her native country Romania at the 1992 Summer Olympics, Barcelona, Spain. With her jump of 6.71 m, she placed 6th. She won a gold medal in long jump event at the Athletics at the 1993 Summer Universiade, Amherst, New York, USA.

She was a lecturer at the Oil & Gas University of Ploieşti and athletics coach at CSU Asesoft Ploiești. In 2009, she obtained a Doctor's degree in Physical Education and Sport at the University of Pitești with a thesis on "The Differentiate Nature of Effort’s Specificity in the Development of Movement Qualities During Athletic Tasks".

Soon after her naturalization in Turkey, Mirela Renda set a national record in long jump with 6.52 m. Her record lasted nine years long until it was broken with 6.62 m by Melis Mey, another naturalized athlete.

Achievements
 4th - 1990 European Athletics Indoor Championships, Glasgow, Scotland
 9th - 1991 IAAF World Indoor Championships, Sevilla, Spain - 6.50 m
 4th - 1992 Summer Olympics, Barcelona, Spain - 6.71 m
 8th - 1993 IAAF World Indoor Championships, Toronto, Canada - 6.55 m
 11th - 1993 World Championships in Athletics, Stuttgart, Germany - 6.48 m
  - Athletics at the 1993 Summer Universiade, Amherst, New York, USA - 6.69 m
 5th - 1994 European Athletics Indoor Championships, Paris, France
 6th - 2000 Osaka Grand Prix, Osaka, Japan

References

External links
 

1966 births
Sportspeople from Ploiești
Romanian female long jumpers
Olympic athletes of Romania
Romanian athletics coaches
Turkish people of Romanian descent
Naturalized citizens of Turkey
Turkish female long jumpers
Athletes (track and field) at the 1992 Summer Olympics
Universiade medalists in athletics (track and field)
Living people
Universiade gold medalists for Romania
Medalists at the 1993 Summer Universiade